Nkwanta District is a former district that was located in Volta Region (now currently in Oti Region), Ghana. Originally created as an ordinary district assembly on 10 March 1989. However on 29 February 2008, it was split off into two new districts: Nkwanta South District (which it was elevated to municipal district assembly status on 14 November 2017 (effectively 15 March 2018); capital: Nkwanta) and Nkwanta North District (capital: Kpassa). The district assembly was located in the northern part of Volta Region and had Nkwanta as its capital town.

References

2007 disestablishments in Ghana

Former districts of Ghana

States and territories disestablished in 2007